2,6-Dichloropyridine is an organohalide with the formula C5H3Cl2N. A white solid, it is one of several isomers of dichlorpyridine.  It serves as a precursor to the antibiotic enoxacin. 2,6-Dichoropyridine is produced by direct reaction of pyridine with chlorine. 2-Chloropyridine is an intermediate.

Toxicity
The  is 115 mg/kg (oral, mice).

References 

Chloropyridines